Victor Nobleza Wood (February 1, 1946 – April 23, 2021) was a Filipino singer, actor and politician. His voice earned him various titles, including "Jukebox King" and "Plaka King".

Before becoming a singer, Wood starred in some productions of Sampaguita Pictures. He was a member of Iglesia ni Cristo. He previously hosted the show Beautiful Sunday every Sunday on the Iglesia ni Cristo-owned Net25.

Wood died on April 23, 2021, due to COVID-19 complications.

Early life
Victor Wood was born on February 1, 1946, in Buhi, Camarines Sur, Philippines to Sgt. Kocky Wood and Rosario "Tiyang Saring" Nobleza. His mother was well known in Buhi and neighboring towns for selling herbal medications and perfumes. He studied and finished secondary school at Jose Abad Santos High.

Musical career
Wood's voice earned him various titles, including Jukebox King and Plaka King in the 1970s when his career bloomed.

In 1972, Wood released his third album In Despair. He became a very popular singer of that era and recorded many albums for Vicor Records. In Despair is an album of cover versions of popular English songs from the 1950s and 1960s. Three songs on the album, namely "Jenny Jenny", "Rip It Up" and "Good Golly Miss Molly", were originally hits for Little Richard in the 1950s. The album has a combination of slow and fast songs, and the slow ballads include "In Despair", "Vaya Con Dios", "Have a Good Time", "Hurt" and "Return to Me". The album's ballads are highly favorable to karaoke singing, and a number of them are still heard in karaoke nightspots. Among the album's upbeat songs are versions of Roy Orbison's "Pretty Woman", Gene Vincent's "Be-Bop-a-Lula" and Del Shannon's "Runaway".

In 1974, Wood released his eleventh album, Ihilak. Eleven of the album's 12 songs are Philippine folk love songs sung in the Visayan language. The remaining song, "Gugma Ko", uses the melody of Neil Diamond's "Song Sung Blue" and replaces the original English lyrics with Visayan-language ones.

In 1979, Wood covered the Indonesian version of "Anak" from the fellow Filipino original artist Freddie Aguilar.

Wood and his family migrated to the United States in the late 1970s.

Acting career
Aside from singing, Wood was also an actor who starred in various films until 1979.

Later life and death
Wood ran for the Senate of the Philippines during the 2007 Philippine general election under the KBL banner, but lost.

According to his third wife, Nerissa, Wood died of complications from COVID-19 on April 23, 2021.

Personal life
Wood has two children with his second wife, Ofelia Mercado Ponce, whom he met during his stay in the United States. The couple have a son, Simon, and a daughter, Sydney Victoria.

Discography

Albums

Studio albums
I'm Sorry My Love (June 1970, Vicor)
Mr. Lonely (1971)
In Despair (1972)
Memories (1972)
14 Bestsellers
Blue Christmas
Knock on Wood
His Majesty
Victor Wood Music
Wood, I Love You
Ihilak (1974, Plaka Pilipino)
Pilipino
Kalyehon 29
Love Is
Wooden Heart
Sincerely
Follow Me
Karon or Visayan Hitsongs Collection Vol. 2
Moods
Victor Wood (1979, Blackgold)
Bintana ng Puso
Kumusta Ka, Mahal
If I See You Again
Padre
Inday ng Buhay Ko
Victor Wood: Ngayon (2002)

Compilation albums
Special Collectors Edition: Malupit Na Pag-ibig (1994, Vicor)
Special Collectors Edition: Mr. Lonely (1994, Vicor)
18 Greatest Hits: Victor Wood (2009, Vicor)

Live albums
One Man Show

Collaboration albums
Jukebox King & Queen (with Imelda Papin) (1999, D'Concorde)

Songs
"Love Can Fly"
"Take My Hand for a While"
"Oh My Love"
"I Don't Want Your Lovin' Anymore"
"Here's My Happiness"
"I'm Gonna Make You Mine"
"Smoke Gets in Your Eyes"
"The Great Pretender"
"Tiny Bubbles"
"The Miracle of Christmas"
"Young and Beautiful"
"For Mama"
"Rock Around the Clock"
"Rock Your Baby"
"Dick and Jane"
"Don't Cry Joni"
"Where Can She Be"
"Pagbati (Feelings)"
"Love Is a Pain in the Heart"
"Let's Sing a Christmas Song"
"Anak" (Indonesian Version; Original in Tagalog by Freddie Aguilar)

Notes

References

External links 
Victor Wood's Profile
Victor Wood as an artist

1946 births
2021 deaths
Deaths from the COVID-19 pandemic in the Philippines
20th-century Filipino male singers
Manila sound musicians
Filipino people of American descent
Singers from Camarines Sur
Male actors from Camarines Sur
Politicians from Camarines Sur
Bicolano politicians
Bicolano actors
Filipino actor-politicians
Kilusang Bagong Lipunan politicians
Members of Iglesia ni Cristo
Vicor Music artists